Heavy Weather is a television film with a screenplay by Douglas Livingstone based on the 1933 novel Heavy Weather by P. G. Wodehouse, set at Blandings Castle. It was made by the BBC and WGBH Boston, first screened by the BBC on Christmas Eve 1995 and shown in the United States on PBS's Masterpiece Theatre on 18 February 1996.

Plot
Though abridged for a 90-minute film, Heavy Weather follows closely the novel of 1933, the fourth in the Blandings series. Many of the familiar elements of the Blandings books are present: the wish of Lord Emsworth's nephew, Ronnie Fish, to marry a chorus girl, Sue Brown; the concern of Emsworth's sisters, the imperious Lady Constance Keeble and Ronnie's mother Lady Julia Fish, to ensure that the reminiscences of their other brother, the Hon. Galahad Threepwood, were not published; Galahad's protectiveness towards Miss Brown, the daughter of his long lost love Dolly Henderson; the sustained efforts of the publisher Lord Tilbury to gain possession of the reminiscences; Lord Emsworth's determination that his prize Berkshire pig, the Empress of Blandings, should win the silver medal in the fat pigs class at the Shrewsbury agricultural show; Lord Emsworth's employment of a private detective, P. Frobisher Pilbeam, to protect the Empress and his rivalry with his neighbour, Sir Gregory Parsloe, of Matchingham Hall, who had not only his own designs on the fat pigs class, but, as a prospective Parliamentary candidate, an interest in suppressing Galahad's reminiscences; and the employment as Lord Emsworth's secretary of Monty Bodkin, who, as with most holders of that office, had an ulterior motive (in this instance, the need to hold down paid employment for a year in order to be considered suitable to marry one Gertrude Butterwick).

Cast 
Peter O'Toole as Clarence Threepwood, Lord Emsworth
 Richard Briers as Galahad Threepwood
 Judy Parfitt as Lady Constance Keeble
 Sarah Badel as Lady Julia Fish
 Roy Hudd as Beach the butler
 Ronald Fraser as Sir Gregory Parsloe
 Richard Johnson as Lord Tilbury, the recently ennobled George "Stinker" Pyke
 David Bamber as Pilbeam
 Rebecca Lacey as Sue Brown
 Benjamin Soames as Ronnie Fish
 Samuel West as Monty Bodkin
 Bryan Pringle as Pirbright
 Matthew Byam-Shaw as Hugo Carmody
 Gertrude of Tiverton as the Empress of Blandings
 Alma-Rose of Iver as the Pride of Matchingham

Production
The screenplay was written by Douglas Livingstone. The director was Jack Gold and the producer was Verity Lambert. David Shanks was co-producer. The production designer was Jane Martin.

Filming location
Heavy Weather was filmed at Sudeley Castle, Gloucestershire, which was widely, though not universally, regarded as Wodehouse's model for Blandings.

References
Notes

Sources

External links
 

1995 television films
1995 films
BBC television dramas
British television films
Films based on works by P. G. Wodehouse
Television shows based on works by P. G. Wodehouse
Films directed by Jack Gold